The TNA Television Championship was a professional wrestling championship owned by the professional wrestling promotion Total Nonstop Action Wrestling (TNA, now Impact Wrestling). Being a professional wrestling championship, it is won via a scripted ending to a match or awarded to a wrestler because of a storyline. All title changes occurred at TNA-promoted events. Title changes that occurred on TNA's television program Impact Wrestling (also known as TNA Impact! until May 3, 2011) usually aired on tape delay and as such are listed with the day the tapings occurred, rather than the air date.

The title was introduced by Booker T as the "TNA Legends Championship" on the October 23, 2008 episode of Impact!. Since its introduction, the title has gone under several different names. It continued as the Legends Championship until Eric Young renamed it the "TNA Global Championship" during his first reign on the October 29, 2009 episode of Impact!. During A.J. Styles' second reign, it was named the "TNA Television Championship" on the July 29, 2010 episode of Impact!. It remained under this name until July 3, 2014, when TNA Executive Director Kurt Angle deactivated the title. It was reactivated a year later when TNA renamed it the TNA King of the Mountain Championship and held a King of the Mountain match at their Slammiversary pay-per-view (PPV) event on June 28 between Jeff Jarrett, Matt Hardy, Young, Drew Galloway, and Bobby Roode. Jarrett won the match and the championship, and as a result of Jarrett being GFW founder, the title was also featured in GFW along with TNA.

The inaugural champion was Booker T. Eric Young holds the record for most reigns, with three, and is the only wrestler to hold the title under all four of its incarnations. The longest reign in the title history is Abyss' second reign at  days. PJ Black and Lashley's only reigns hold the record for shortest reign in the title's history at one day. Abyss holds the record for combined days as champion, with 460. Overall, there have been 25 reigns shared among 19 wrestlers, with three vacancies and two deactivations.

Reigns

Reigns

Combined reigns

Footnotes
A. Each wrestler's total number of days as champion is ranked highest to lowest; wrestlers with the same number are tied for that certain rank.

References
General

Specific

External links
Impact Wrestling Television Championship

Television wrestling championships
Impact Wrestling champions lists